Rupinder "Rup" Singh Magon (Punjabi: ਰੁਪਿੰਦਰ ਸਿੰਘ ਮਗੋਨ) is a Canadian singer, songwriter, producer, actor and author born and raised in Montreal, Quebec. He is a co-lead singer of JoSH, a South Asian fusion band.

Music career
Rup founded Josh in 1996 with his brother, Rik Magon, and good friend Shiraz  'Shazi' Hussain. They were joined by Qurram 'q' Hussein, Rup's current band-mate, in 1998, and two years later Rup and Q embarked on their own path for JoSH without Rik and Shiraz.  

Rup's love and drive for music and the arts, and his unquestioned belief that he could make a career for himself singing South Asian Fusion music, despite being based in Canada, was initially met with doubt and skepticism from friends and family, who wanted him to pursue a more traditional 'North American' career not based in the arts.  Rup never relented, working tirelessly with Q to produce their first compositions for Josh, "Main Hoon Tanha", which also ended up being the title track for their debut album. 

Rup and Q have continued to produce successful music and albums including Kabhi (2004), Josh's much-anticipated second album, Mausam (2006), JoSH's third album, and Beyond Kismat, JoSH's most-recent fourth album released in 2010. JoSH has worked on various other projects as well,  including a remix of Grammy winner Nelly Furtado's latest singles, "Promiscuous Girl" and "Maneater".

Among Rup's accomplishments as a member of JoSH include becoming the first Canadian Sikh to win both MTV India and MTV Pakistan awards  

Rup has also ventured outside of the realm of music to expand his career within the umbrella of the Performing Arts.

Acting
Rup is in the  2011 sports comedy film Speedy Singhs (also known as Breakaway), directed by Robert Lieberman, starring Vinay Virmani, Russell Peters, Camilla Belle, and Anupam Kher. Rup plays the role of Jassi Singh, a member of the Speedy Singhs hockey team featured in the film.  Akshay Kumar, Drake, and Ludacris also make cameo appearances in the film. 

JoSH  recorded the title track for the Speedy Singhs/Breakaway film, titled "Chaddi Wale Yaar" 

In 2020 he appeared as Amandeep in the comedy web series Decoys.

Author
In 2011, Rup released the cookbook Ten Easy Desi Recipes for Guys featuring Indian cuisine.

References
Citations

External links
 PlanetJoSH.com Rup Magon Bio
 Breakaway Official Website
 Feature - Times of India
 Speedy Singhs - Times of India

Living people
Year of birth missing (living people)
Musicians from Montreal
Canadian world music musicians
Canadian Sikhs
Punjabi people
Canadian male film actors
Canadian male web series actors